VTV1 is a state-owned Vietnamese-language news channel and also the first television channel of Vietnam Television Station, and the third channel of VTV to broadcast HD, broadcast continuously with a duration of 24 hours a day from June 15, 2011, to present, with nearly 20 news bulletins and dozens of weekly columns, referring to current political issues of the country.

The channel was formerly a general news, sports and entertainment channel until VTV3 launched in 1996 and when VTV1 became an all-news channel. It also features news in Vietnamese, formerly with English and French. Since 15 June 2011, VTV1 becomes a round-the-clock news, politics, current affairs and generalistic channel, the first of its kind in Vietnam. VTV1 performs political tasks assigned by the Communist Party of Vietnam, the State and the Government, plays the leading role in information, propaganda, publicity, prestige and great influence on the press system television and radio in Vietnam. Sites such as https://vtvgo.vn/ are able to support online live viewing of VTV channels.

Organizational structure

Leader 
 Chairman: Đỗ Đức Hoàng (from April 2021).
 Vice Chairman: Nguyễn Thu Hà, Hà Thu Hằng, Bùi Hồng Phúc, Nguyễn Kim Hải, Vũ Xuân Dung.
 Former Head of Committee: Nguyễn Thị Thu Hiền.

Head of the Board through the periods 
 Trần Bình Minh (July 9, 1970 - Jan 1, 2011).
 Lê Ngọc Quang (Jan 1, 2011 - April 1, 2021).
 Đỗ Đức Hoàng (April 1, 2021 - now).

Affiliated rooms and units 
 Social Room
 Culture - Sports - Tourism Room
 Newsroom - Current affairs
 Foreign Affairs Room
 Economics - Agriculture - Environment Room
 Political Department - Internal Affairs
 Secretarial - Editorial Room
 Newsroom - Administration
 Weather & Disaster Warning Center

Broadcast hours
 From 7 September 1970 to 1972: 19:00 to 21:00 (Wednesday and Sunday).
 From 1973 to 30 April 1975:
 From Monday to Friday: 11:00 to 23:00
 Saturday and Sunday: 11:30 to 23:00
 From 1 May 1975 to 31 December 1975: 12:00 to 23:00
 From 31 December 1975 to 18 May 1980:
 From Monday to Friday: 11:00 to 23:00
 Saturday: 08:00 to 23:00
 Sunday: 08:30 to 23:00
 From 19 May 1980 to 31 December 1986:
 From Monday to Friday: 15:00 to 23:00
 Saturday and Sunday: 09:00 to 23:00
 From 31 December 1986 to 31 December 1989:
 From Monday to Friday: 16:00 to 23:00
 Saturday and Sunday: 08:00 to 23:00
 From 31 December 1989 to 31 December 1994: 
 Morning: 09:00 to 12:00
 Afternoon: 14:00 to 17:00
 Night: 19:00 to 23:00
 From 31 December 1994 to 31 March 1998:
 Morning: 06:00 to 10:00
 Evening: 17:00 to 23:00
 From 1 April 1998 to 31 December 2001:
 Morning: 05:30 to 10:00
 Evening: 17:00 to 23:00
 From 1 January 2002 to 31 August 2010: 05:30 to 00:00
 From 1 September 2010 to 14 June 2011: 05:00 to 00:00
 From 15 June 2011 to present: 24/7.

Contents
The content on VTV1 channel is mainly political programs, daily program hours, talk shows, social programs, [...]  economic, culture,... bring a lot of useful information to the audience, as well as serve to propagate the lines and ideas of the Party, State & Government in Vietnam.  Not only that, VTV1 also has programs: sports, entertainment, music, especially every weekend, special movies (Asian dramas timeslot at 13:00 every day, Vietnamese dramas at 21:00 Monday-Friday night [30 minutes], 8:00 Monday-Friday reruns) and programs explore, engaging and engaging.

See also
Vietnam Television
List of television programmes broadcast by Vietnam Television (VTV)

References

External links
VTV Official Web
VTV1 Live
VTV1
 List of television programmes broadcast by Vietnam Television (VTV)

Vietnam Television
Television channels and stations established in 1970
24-hour television news channels
Television networks in Vietnam
1970 establishments in Vietnam
Classic television networks